Locked in the Arms of a Crazy Life, a book by Howard Sounes, published in 1998 by Grove Press, is a biography of American writer Charles Bukowski.

References 
Sounes, Howard (1998). Charles Bukowski: Locked in the Arms of a Crazy Life

External links 
 Review

1998 non-fiction books
American biographies
Charles Bukowski
Biographies about writers